BritGrav  (British Gravity Meeting) is an annual meeting, based in the United Kingdom and Ireland, for academics whose research is connected to gravitation. The meeting covers a broad range of topics, including general relativity, quantum gravity, gravitational-wave detection and astronomy, the astrophysics of black holes and neutron stars, cosmology, and experimentation.

Many of the talks are given by postdocs and graduate students, and are between 10 and 20 minutes. During BritGrav 15 at the University of Birmingham in 2015, 78% of the talks were by students and 18% were by post-docs.

The first meeting was held at the University of Southampton in 2001. The 2015 meeting was organised by the University of Birmingham; following the close of the meeting, there was a public lecture on gravitational-wave detection by James Hough.

Past meetings

References

Academic conferences
Academia in the United Kingdom
Physics conferences
Astronomy conferences
Mathematics conferences
2001 establishments in the United Kingdom
Recurring events established in 2001
Science events in the United Kingdom
Science events in Ireland